Rayadurg–Tumkur section is an ongoing broad-gauge railway line project in the Indian states of Andhra Pradesh and Karnataka. It connects Rayadurg in Andhra Pradesh with Tumkur in Karnataka.

History 
The foundation stone for this project was laid in October 2011 with an outlay of 857.31 crores.

Jurisdiction 
This project falls under the jurisdiction of both Andhra Pradesh and Karnataka states with a distance of 94 km and 113 km. This line falls under the jurisdiction of Hubli railway division of the South Western Railway Zone.

Status
As of now 63 km of track is operational.

Route
This line passes through Kalyandurg, Kadiridevarapalli, Doddahalli, Pavagada,  Madakasira, Medigeshi, Madhugiri, Urukere and ends at Tumkur.

References 

Proposed railway lines in India
Bangalore railway division
Guntakal railway division
5 ft 6 in gauge railways in India